The 2005–06 Slovenian Football Cup was the 15th season of the Slovenian Football Cup, Slovenia's football knockout competition. Lower league teams played in the first two rounds and the Slovenian PrvaLiga teams joined in the Round of 16.

Qualified clubs

2005–06 Slovenian PrvaLiga members
Bela Krajina
Celje
Domžale
Drava Ptuj
Gorica
Koper
Maribor
Nafta Lendava
Primorje
Rudar Velenje

Additional place: Zagorje

Qualified through MNZ Regional Cups
MNZ Ljubljana: Svoboda, Livar, Dolomiti Dobrova
MNZ Maribor: Malečnik, Dravograd, Pesnica
MNZ Koper: Jadran Dekani, Korte
MNZ Nova Gorica: Tolmin, Brda
MNZ Murska Sobota: Ižakovci, Tišina
MNZ Lendava: Črenšovci
MNZG-Kranj: Triglav Kranj, Jesenice
MNZ Ptuj: Aluminij, Ormož

First round

|}

Second round

|}

Round of 16

|}

Quarter-finals

|}

Semi-finals

|}

Final

References

Slovenian Football Cup seasons
Cup
Slovenian Cup